Doctor Bertram is a 1957 West German drama film directed by Werner Klingler and starring Willy Birgel, Winnie Markus and Lucie Mannheim. It is based upon the play by Hans Rehfisch. It was shot at the Bavaria Studios in Munich.The film's sets were designed by the art directors Max Mellin and Karl Weber.

Cast
 Willy Birgel as Doctor Bertram
 Winnie Markus as Martina Eichstätter
 Antje Geerk as Hilde Bogner
 Sonja Ziemann as Nelly
 Lucie Mannheim as Frau Losch
 Dietmar Schönherr as Kurt Losch
 Franz Muxeneder as Hubke
 Helen Vita as Frau Sommerfeld
 Hermann Nehlsen as Doctor Warsitz
 Trude Hesterberg as Frau Gollicke
 Ingrid Lutz as Frau Krusius
 Angelika Ritter
 Florentine von Castell
 Klaus Langer
 Werner Lieven

References

Bibliography 
 Bergfelder, Tim & Bock, Hans-Michael. ''The Concise Cinegraph: Encyclopedia of German. Berghahn Books, 2009.

External links 
 

1957 films
West German films
German drama films
1957 drama films
1950s German-language films
Films directed by Werner Klingler
German films based on plays
Medical-themed films
Films about abortion
Films shot at Bavaria Studios
1950s German films